Falna railway station is a railway station serving Falna, a town in Pali district, Rajasthan. Its code is FA.

It is one of the "A" category stations of Ajmer division in North Western Railway zone. The station falls on the Jaipur-Ahmedabad line. Due to large passenger traffic, it is the second highest earning station in Ajmer division. The station consists of 3 platforms. The platform is well sheltered. Many facilities including Water Vending Machine, Ticket Vending Machine and sanitation . Falna Station equipped with 70 kW solar power supply. Falna Railway station is a part of Western Dedicated Freight Corridor. Construction had already begun & will be completed within few years.

Major trains 

Being a "A" category railway station, around 87 trains halt at Falna. Many important trains halts at Falna, most prominent of them being the Swarna Jayanti Rajdhani Express. Some of the other important trains that run from Falna are:

 Chennai Egmore-Jodhpur Superfast Express
 Mysore-Ajmer Express
 Puri-Ajmer Express
 Hisar-Coimbatore AC Superfast Express
 Agra Cantt-Ahmedabad Superfast Express
 Sabarmati-Ajmer Intercity Express
 Ahmedabad-Gorakhpur Express
 Ahmedabad-Jammu Tawi Express 
 Hazur Sahib Nanded-Shri Ganganagar Superfast Express
 Ahmedabad–Lucknow Weekly Express
 Ahmedabad–Varanasi Weekly Express
 Ahmedabad–Shri Mata Vaishno Devi Katra Express
 Ahmedabad–Jodhpur Passenger 
 Ahmedabad–Jaipur Passenger 
 Ahmedabad–Sultanpur Weekly Express

 Ajmer–KSR Bengaluru Garib Nawaz Express
 Dadar–Ajmer Superfast Express
 Mysore–Ajmer Express
 Ala Hazrat Express (via Ahmedabad)
 Amrapur Aravali Express
 Ashram Express
 Bandra Terminus–Delhi Sarai Rohilla Express
 Bhagat Ki Kothi–KSR Bengaluru Express
 Bhagat Ki Kothi–Yesvantpur SpecialFare Special
 Bhagat Ki Kothi–Pune Express
 Bhavnagar Terminus–Delhi Sarai Rohilla Link Express
 Bhavnagar Terminus–Jammu Tawi SpecialFare Special
 Yesvantpur–Bikaner Express
 Chandigarh–Bandra Terminus Superfast Express
 Rajkot–Delhi Sarai Rohilla Weekly Superfast Express
 Delhi Sarai Rohilla–Bandra Terminus Garib Rath Express
 Porbandar–Delhi Sarai Rohilla Superfast Express
 Hazur Sahib Nanded–Ajmer Gokripa Mahotsav Special
 Bandra Terminus–Hisar Superfast Express
 Jaipur–Okha Weekly Express
 Bandra Terminus–Jaisalmer Superfast Express
 Jammu Tawi–Bandra Terminus Vivek Express
 Valsad–Jodhpur Weekly Express
 Ranakpur Express
 Ahmedabad–Kolkata Express
 Suryanagri Express
 Uttaranchal Express
 Yesvantpur–Bhagat Ki Kothi Suvidha Special
 Haridwar Mail

References

Railway stations in Pali district
Ajmer railway division